Ammar Al-Baluchi (also transliterated as Amar Al-Balochi, born Ali Abdul Aziz Ali, 29 August 1977) is a Pakistani citizen in U.S. custody at Guantanamo Bay detention camp. Charges against him include "facilitating the 9/11 attackers, acting as a courier for Osama bin Laden and plotting to crash a plane packed with explosives into the U.S. consulate in Karachi."

A member of the same al-Baluchi clan as Khalid Sheikh Muhammad (KSM) and Ramzi Yousef, U.S. officials state that he was a "key Lieutenant" of his uncle KSM who assisted KSM in the execution of the September 11 attacks, and that he told investigators that he had sought help in al-Qaeda's efforts to develop biological weapons to use against its enemies. He reportedly married and then divorced Aafia Siddiqui, the Pakistani scientist convicted of shooting at US soldiers and incarcerated in the United States.

He was arrested in 2003 and held in the Salt Pit, a CIA black site in Afghanistan, during which he was extensively tortured. The CIA used Baluchi as a "training prop" to teach torture techniques to interrogators; trainees took turns shoving his head into a wall in sessions which lasted for hours, causing him brain damage. He was also doused with ice water and kept in stress positions. His torture did not yield the CIA any useful intelligence. Baluchi was transferred to the Guantanamo Bay detention camp in 2006. In 2018, the United Nations called for his immediate release from arbitrary detention.

Early life
Ammar al-Baluchi was born in Al Ahmadi, Kuwait, and is the maternal nephew of Khalid Sheikh Mohammed (organizer of the 9/11 attacks) and cousin of Ramzi Yousef, the organizer of the 1993 World Trade Center bombing. The extended family of al-Baluchi is ethnically Baluchi and originally from Balochistan. The family patriarch and his brother were lay Deobandi preachers. They moved the family to Kuwait in the 1960s.

Baluchi grew up in Kuwait but spent most of teenage years in Iranian Baluchistan, but is a citizen of Pakistan. Trained as a computer technician, he dressed in Western clothes and "introduced himself as a businessman", but had been "groomed ... since boyhood" by his cousins and uncles "to join their clandestine war," according to journalist Debra Scroggins. According to a U.S. government biography, his "chief mentor" was his cousin and 1993 World Trade Center bombing orchestrator Ramzi Yousef, "who taught him in the early 1990s in Iran about the importance of war against the West."

He is fluent in English and worked at Mohammed's honey-processing company in Karachi for a while before being hired in 1998 as a computer technician for Modern Electronics Corporation in Dubai. According to some evidence given at the Combatant Status Review Tribunal, he was "very open-minded and western-oriented", while his ex-wife told investigators he was "a very strict Muslim" who opposed his wife's leaving the home.

Career in jihad

Preparation for 9/11 
According to a U.S. government biography, Baluchi "volunteered his services" to uncle KSM in 1997.

According to U.S. officials, the majority of money that came to the Saudi hijackers for the September 11 attacks was transferred through Baluchi and Mustafa al-Hawsawi.
The 9/11 Commission reported that he "helped them with plane tickets, traveler's checks, and hotel reservations", and "taught them about everyday aspects of life in the West, such as purchasing clothes and ordering food". In his defence, Baluchi claims that he often helped people in Dubai with such things to supplement his income, and he had no way of knowing whether any of them were criminals.

On 10 October 1998, Baluchi used his passport to open a bank account with the Emirates Bank International, using the name "Ali" based on his nasab Ibn Abdulaziz Ali and listing his employer's address with PO box 16958, Jebel Ali, Dubai.

He was then introduced to Marwan al-Shehhi by his uncle, and Shehhi allegedly asked him to help transfer money from Shehhi's company in Dubai to his company in the United States, ostensibly to help avoid banking fees if he transferred the money himself.

In January 2000, an order using Shehhi's credit card had a Boeing 747-400 flight simulator program, a Boeing 767 flight deck video, and some flight attendant literature and flight manuals shipped to Baluchi's work address. Baluchi then shipped them to his uncle to pass onto Shehhi.

On 18 April, Baluchi sent a wire transfer of $5,000 to Adel Rafeea, the administrator of the Islamic Center of San Diego, from the Wall Street Exchange Centre in Dubai, using his PO Box, passport and listing his phone number as 0506745651. Rafeaa later claimed that Nawaf al-Hazmi had asked him to accept the money on his behalf.

Tracing the calls made to Baluchi's phone number, authorities discovered that he had received 16 calls from 28 to 30 June from a pre-paid Voicestream mobile purchased in Manhattan on 4 June. The phone was deactivated on 11 July, and authorities allege it belonged to Atta, while Baluchi insisted that he only ever spoke with Shehhi, who had hired him. Around this time, Baluchi complained to Mohammed that he couldn't do all this additional work himself, and his uncle told him that Mustafa al-Hawsawi would co-ordinate with him to act as an assistant.

On 29 June, a man named "Isam Mansur" wired $5,000 to the Western Union at 1440 Broadway in New York, where Shehhi picked it up. This is alleged to have been Baluchi, since two later direct payments into Shehhi's Sun Trust account from the Exchange Center, a $10,000 payment to Shehhi on 18 July from "Isam Mansur" and a $9,500 5 August payment from "Isam Mansour", gave Baluchi's PO Box number.

On 8 August, Baluchi opened a bank account at Dubai Islamic Bank, using his name, passport and phone number. A $20,000 payment from Baluchi's bank account to Shehhi's Sun Trust account on 29 August gave a phone number one digit different from the one given by Isam Mansour on 5 August.

A $70,000 payment was made to Shehhi's account by "Hani (Fawaz Trading)" on 17 September from the same exchange centre. Hani gave a telephone number one digit removed from the one Baluchi used on the transfer from his bank account on 29 August.

In September, Hani Hanjour went to Dubai, where Baluchi gave him $3,000 to open a new bank account, and later deposited $5,000 in the account which Hanjour later accessed from ATMs in the United States. When Ahmed al-Ghamdi went to Dubai, Baluchi helped him purchase a cell phone. It is believed nine of the hijackers met with him in Dubai and received various levels of aid.

The 9/11 Commission Report stated that he "relied on the unremarkable nature of his transactions, which were essentially invisible amid the billions of dollars flowing daily across the globe."

On 27 August 2001, Baluchi applied for a visa to travel to the United States for a week after his employer announced the closing of their Dubai branch, and the government had sent notices informing the employees their work permits had been rescinded and they had to leave the country. He was declined since he appeared to be an economic immigrant, and instead moved back home to Pakistan a few days before the attacks.

Post-9/11 
Moving back in with his parents in Karachi, Pakistan, Baluchi saw his uncle several times when he came to visit. According to a short biography written by the United States government's Central Intelligence Agency (CIA), after the Taliban was initially driven from power after the 9/11 attack, al-Balouchi assisted KSM in organizing the movement of al-Qaeda operatives and their families to safehouses in Pakistan. 
 According to US government information, KSM had Balouchi be the "communications intermediary" between al-Qaeda and "shoe bombers" Richard Reid and Saajid Badat. In early 2002 Balouchi helped his uncle "prepare operatives" for travel from Pakistan to the United States, "ostensibly to carry out attacks".
 Another plan was to hijack airliners and crash them into London's Heathrow airport, but this plan was set aside in order to focus on a plan to bomb the US Consulate and other Western targets in Karachi.
 He also worked with his uncle to prepare Majid Khan and others for travel to the United States to conduct terrorist operations.
 Balouchi reportedly sent Majid Khan to Thailand in late 2002 to deliver $50,000 to finance a plan by Jemaah Islamiya leader Hambali (Riduan Isamuddin) to attack US and Israeli targets in Southeast Asia. 
He later told investigators he helped his uncle arrange travel visas for people, but didn't know whether any of them were militants or not. In August 2002, the FBI questioned Abdul Samad Din Mohammed, the brother-in-law of Khalid Sheikh Mohammed. He reported that Baluchi was often in the company of his uncle, and would pick people up from the airport. His uncle KSM was arrested in Rawalpindi on 1 March 2003. Baluchi spent the next two months with Walid bin 'Attash. According to US reports, following his uncle's arrest Baluchi took charge of some of the new attacks being planned.

Marriage 
Baluchi also married Aafia Siddiqui. She was accused of being an al-Qaeda member and in February 2010 was convicted of assaulting with a deadly weapon and attempting to kill U.S. soldiers and FBI agents who were seeking to interrogate her while she was in custody, claimed to be married to Baluchi. The marriage was confirmed by Pakistani and US intelligence, a defense psychologist, and Khalid Sheikh Mohammed's family. (Siddiqui's family denies she was married to Baluchi.)

According to the FBI, after her arrest, Aafia Siddiqui told them that after she learned she was wanted by the US government she had gone into hiding around late March 2003 with the al-Baluchi clan. Divorced at the time, she stated she married Baluchi out of religious piety, since she "could not live in the same house with an unmarried male" (namely Baluchi) she married him. Their marriage was held in Hub Chowki outside of Karachi in the inner courtyard of Balouchi's house, with female al-Baluchi family members present. Siddiqui describes Balouchi as very kind to her, "a good man who is wrongly accused". (Siddiqui later repudiated all statements given to the FBI.)

The marriage lasted only a couple of months. According to one of KSM's uncles, Mohammed Hussein, Baluchi became alienated with Aafia's "liberal way of life". Aafia told the FBI that Baluchi divorced her after he was arrested.

Capture and treatment in US custody

Siddiqui was arrested 29 April 2003 in Karachi along with al-Attash. Baluchi had a copy of a letter to Osama bin Laden from Saudi scholars in his pocket, a computer disk containing a draft of a letter to bin Laden, two images of the September 11 attacks, and a perfume bottle containing low-concentration cyanide used to bleach and perfume clothes. Baluchi was also accused of discussing the possibility of exporting explosives to the United States through textile companies, but claims to have no knowledge of what conversation is being referenced. The arrests led to the arrests of Jawad al-Bashar and Farzand Shah. On 7 November 2003, a detainee was interrogated and said that Mohamed Atta and Ramzi bin al-Shibh spoke briefly in August 2000 about a "Losh" who had asked Atta if he could travel to the United States to help with any potential plots, having already asked Mohammed three months earlier. Authorities allege this is a reference to Baluchi.

Baluchi was extensively tortured by the CIA after his arrest, while being held at a CIA black site north of Kabul, Afghanistan. The extent of his torture was detailed in a 2008 report by the CIA's inspector general, declassified in March 2022. According to the inspector general, Baluchi was held there "extra-legally" as he was a Pakistani citizen who no longer presented a terrorist threat, and it was not clear to him whether Baluchi's torture was even intended to elicit information; the inspector general concluded that Baluchi's torture ultimately yielded no useful intelligence.

While in CIA custody, Baluchi served as a "training prop" to teach torture techniques to trainee CIA interrogators. One torture technique, known as "walling", was often practiced on Baluchi. In it, trainees would line up and take turns "shoving" a naked and tied-up Baluchi head-first into a plywood wall behind him, with sessions typically lasting for a few hours each. One of the instructors identified the goal being to "bounce" Baluchi's head off the wall. Analysis carried out by a neuropsychologist in 2018 found "abnormalities indicating moderate to severe brain damage" consistent with traumatic brain injury in Baluchi's brain. In addition, the inspector general said that interrogators in the black site also carried out torture that went beyond the CIA's guidelines, including dousing him with ice water and forcing him to kneel backwards with a stick behind his knees in a stress position. In a senate report from 2014, officials noted: "al-Baluchi was tortured and forcibly dunked into a tub filled with ice water. CIA interrogators forcibly kept his head under water while he struggled to breathe and beat him repeatedly with a truncheon-like object hitting him and smashing his head against a wall."

In December 2005, Human Rights Watch listed him as a "ghost detainee" held in the CIA prison system. Baluchi was kept in CIA custody until 6 September 2006, when he was transferred to Guantanamo Bay Prison in Cuba.
Other plots to attack civilian targets
According to US investigators, Baluchi told them that al-Qaeda had set up a biological weapons lab and he asked Aafia Siddiqui (who has a biology degree from MIT) advice on how long it would take to develop such weapons and whether the man in charge was capable of developing the weapons. Siddiqui replied that she "was willing to participate in a biological weapons (BW) project if al-Qaida tasked her to do so".

Another plot involving Baluchi alleged by US investigators involved Heathrow airport. According to Balochi's file, he told interrogators that he became aware of a plan to attack Heathrow airport in January 2003 and had intended to seek help from a more senior al-Qaida operative, Walid bin Attash, to carry it out.

An "analyst note" in the files notes that the plot called for "crashing numerous airplanes into Heathrow, with a secondary explosion immediately outside of the airport as a diversion". It collapsed after KSM was arrested in March 2003.

Guantanamo Bay
On 6 September 2006, Baluchi was transferred from a black site location to Guantanamo Bay detention camp. He was given the Internment Serial Number 10018 and is currently detained at a top-secret site at the Guantanamo base that allegedly houses approximately 15 "high-value" prisoners. Its location and the conditions inside are withheld from public knowledge and there are suspected grave human rights concerns regarding its conditions. Al-Baluchi's attorney James G. Connell, III visited him there in August 2013 under an order issued by the military commission.

Combatant Status Review Tribunal 

US District Court Justice Joyce Hens Green ruled that the Combatant Status Review Tribunals were unconstitutional. Nevertheless, the Department of Defense scheduled Tribunals for the 14 high-value captives who were transferred from covert CIA custody, on 6 September 2006, for early winter of 2007.

The Summary of Evidence memo for Baluchi's Combatant Status Review Tribunal was drafted on 8 February 2007.

Baluchi cooperated with his tribunal. Although he was not able to call Khalid Sheikh Mohammed, Saifullah Paracha or Ramzi bin al-Shibh to testify about his lack of connection to al-Qaeda, he was permitted to have his legal representative field statements they had made. He chose to put forward the statements by Mohammed and bin al-Shibh as evidence, but not the statement by Paracha.

Baluchi requested statements be garnered from Modern Electronics Corporation personnel, including Samir Sharin, Mohammed Mayer, Asraf Mayer, Ammar al-Tesqui and Sayed Tesqui that would testify he had no connections to militant forces, and that his employee records would show that he left several days before the attacks because his work permit had expired when MEC closed its Dubai branch. The tribunal judge ruled that although Baluchi's leaving Dubai a few days prior to the attacks was among the reasons for his capture, it was not relevant to seek records from his employer. Since the tribunal did not locate the individuals, Baluchi submit two statements he had written himself as what he believed his co-workers would say, and what he believed his Israeli roommates would say.

In his defence, Baluchi argued that he often acted as a "businessman" to supplement his income, and thus his signature, telephone number and similar details were easily obtained in Dubai. He admitted dealing with Marwan al-Shehhi, but said that "when [he] approached me, he never declared himself as 'hijacker Marwan al Shehhi'. He approached me the same way he approached other individuals and companies in the U.S., a man wanting to do business".

The Department of Defense announced on August 9, 2007 that all fourteen of the "high-value detainees" who had been transferred to Guantanamo from the CIA's black sites, had been officially classified as "enemy combatants". Although judges Peter Brownback and Keith J. Allred had ruled two months earlier that only "illegal enemy combatants" could face military commissions, the Department of Defense waived the qualifier and said that all fourteen men could now face charges before Guantanamo military commissions.

First military commission

In February 2008, Baluchi was committed to a joint trial, charged with conspiracy, attacking civilians and civilian objects, causing serious bodily injury, murder, destruction of property, hijacking, terrorism and providing material support for terrorism.

Al Baluchi, Walid Bin Attash, and Khalid Sheikh Mohammed chose to serve as their own attorney.
They requested laptops, and internet access, in order to prepare their defences. In October 2008, Ralph Kohlmann ruled that the men be provided with the computers, but not the internet access.
Al Baluchi's request said he was a Microsoft Certified software engineer.

On 8 December 2008, Khalid Sheikh Mohammed told the judge that he and the other four indictees wished to plead guilty; however, the plea would be delayed until after mental competency hearings for Hawsawi and bin al-Shibh. Mohammed said, "We want everyone to plead together."

January 2009 Executive Order to Close Guantanamo

On 22 January 2009, United States President Barack Obama issued Executive Order 13492, ordering a halt to the Guantanamo military commission as part of the overall closure of Guantanamo Bay Detention Camp. On 21 April 2009, United States Senate minority leader Mitch McConnell cited "Ali Abd al-Azeez Ali" as an example of the kind of captive United States President Barack Obama might free in the United States when he closes the camp in January 2010, because he didn't know what else to do with him.

Second military commission

In October 2011, in an operation called the "baseline review," the prison seized all legal materials belonging to "high-value detainees," starting with Abd al-Rahim al-Nashiri. The prison also announced that it would change its previous policy and begin reviewing legal mail for its content. In response, the Chief Defense Counsel (United States) ordered the attorneys under his supervision to stop sending privileged communications to Guantanamo prisoners. Under the Chief Defense Counsel (United States) policy, Al-Baluchi could not receive mail from his attorneys until November 2013.

On 4 April 2012, the Department of Defense referred Guantanamo military commission charges against al Baluchi and four other men for participation in the conspiracy leading up to the September 11 attacks. On 5 May 2012, Military Judge James Pohl arraigned al Baluchi, and appointed attorneys to represent him.

Hearing of 17 September 2019, considers the admissibility of clean team evidence

During a preliminary hearing, held on 17 September 2019, the prosecution released a transcript from a conversation al-Baluchi had with another captive, when they were in two nearby recreation yards. It had not been known, until the release of this transcript, that the recreation yards contained hidden listening devices. According to an article by Carol Rosenberg, published in The New York Times, Camp Seven had at least two recreation yards. Captives got a whole recreation yard to themselves, during their outdoor recreation time. But they could hear other captives in nearby yards, and could communicate with them, by yelling.

Prosecutors claimed the transcript's discussion of a confession al Baluchi was considering, drafted for him by fellow captive Ramzi bin al-Shibh, was evidence of al Baluchi's guilt. His defense attorney's argued that his willingness to consider a confession was an after effect of his years of torture.

The purpose of the hearing was to help a new judge, W. Shane Cohen, make a decision as to whether confessions given to the "clean team" were still compromised by al Baluchi's torture.

Zero Dark Thirty

A fictionalized account of al-Baluchi's interrogation at black sites is depicted in the 2012 film Zero Dark Thirty. The character Ammar is portrayed by Reda Kateb. Al-Baluchi has complained that the United States has provided more information to the filmmakers Kathryn Bigelow and Mark Boal about al-Baluchi's treatment in CIA custody than it has to Baluchi's own attorneys.

The CIA acknowledged that the character Ammar is based on al-Baluchi. In the film, CIA interrogator Dan Fuller and other characters repeatedly describe Ammar as Khalid Sheikh Mohammed's nephew. Fuller also references the arrest of Ammar and describes his role as the financial facilitator in the 9/11 attacks. "The first 25 minutes of the movie are largely taken up with torture: Ammar is strung up, beaten, water boarded and kept awake for 96 hours straight."

References

Citations

Books and journal articles

External links
"Al Qaeda Agent's 9/11 Role Comes Into Focus", L.A. Times, 21 May 2006.
Pentagon charges 6 in 9-11 attacks
'Clean team' interrogated 9-11 suspects

1977 births
Living people
Baloch people
People from Kuwait City
People from Karachi
Kuwaiti al-Qaeda members
Pakistani al-Qaeda members
Detainees of the Guantanamo Bay detention camp
Kuwaiti extrajudicial prisoners of the United States
Pakistani extrajudicial prisoners of the United States
People associated with the September 11 attacks
Kuwaiti expatriates in Pakistan
Pakistani expatriates in the United Arab Emirates
Kuwaiti people of Pakistani descent
Kuwaiti people of Yemeni descent
Pakistani people of Yemeni descent
Yemeni people of Pakistani descent